Tatiana Sousa (born 16 February 1975) is a Greek handball player who competed in the 2004 Summer Olympics.

References

1975 births
Living people
Greek female handball players
Olympic handball players of Greece
Handball players at the 2004 Summer Olympics
Place of birth missing (living people)